Kannikadass Antony William is an Indian Catholic bishop who became the Bishop of Mysore on January 26, 2017. He succeeded Bishop Thomas Vazhapilly, who retired after reaching the canonical age of retirement.

Early life 
Msgr. William was born on February 27, 1965, in Pollibetta, Mysore. He was the only son of M. G. Antony and J. Philomena. He completed his primary and secondary education at Good Shepherd School, St. Mary’s School, and St. Philomena’s High School, all located in Mysore.

After completing his secondary education, he entered St. Mary’s Minor Seminary in Bannimantap, Mysore, and simultaneously enrolled at St. Philomena’s College in Mysore. Later, he completed his Bachelor's degree in Philosophy and a year of Regency at St. Antony’s Shrine Dornahalli, K. R. Nagar before moving to St. Peter’s Pontifical Seminary in Bangalore to pursue his theological studies.

He completed his Master’s degree in Canon Law from St. Peter’s Pontifical Institute in Bangalore and also acquired a Bachelor's degree in Education and a Master's degree in Christianity from the University of Mysore.

Priesthood 
In 1992, Msgr. William was ordained as a deacon by Msgr. Francis Michelappa, the then Bishop of Mysore, and a year later, on May 18, 1993, he was ordained as a priest for the Diocese of Mysore by Msgr. Ignatius Pinto, the Archbishop Emeritus of Bangalore and the then Bishop of Shimoga.

Episcopate 
Msgr. William was appointed as the Bishop of Mysore on January 26, 2017. He received his Episcopal Ordination and was installed on Monday, February 27, 2017, at the Cathedral of St. Joseph and St. Philomena, Mysuru. He has also been actively involved in the education sector, particularly in the development of schools and colleges.

On 7 January 2023, Msgr. William took a period of absence from the Diocese of Mysore. It was announced that the Archbishop Emeritus of Bangalore, Bernard Moras was appointed as Apostolic Administrator of the Diocese of Mysore by the Vatican Dicastery for Evangelization. Msgr. Moras will oversee the diocese until a new bishop is appointed.

Controversies 
Msgr. William has been at the center of several controversies during his tenure as the leader of the Diocese of Mysore. Accusations of sexual misconduct, corruption, kidnapping, and collusion in murder have all been leveled against him. In 2019, 37 priests in the Mysore diocese wrote to the Vatican demanding William’s resignation, citing his fathering of children from various affairs, connections to corrupt officials, and ties to organized crime.

The Vatican sponsored an investigation in February 2021, which was prompted by the 2019 letter and additional charges from a group of 113 people, including 22 priests. In April 2022, 11 priests and one layperson from the Mysore traveled to New Delhi to plead for William’s ouster. In July of the same year, another Mysore priest, Father Gnana Prakash, lodged additional charges against William, including complicity in the deaths of four priests who signed the 2019 letter.

Despite the mounting allegations against him, Msgr. William has denied all charges and claimed that some priests were trying to derail his reform efforts. The Vatican placed William on administrative leave effective January 7, 2023.

See also 

 List of Catholic bishops of India

References 

1965 births
Living people
Indian bishops
University of Mysore alumni